Hans Petter Tholfsen (2 November 1946 – 10 September 2014) was a Norwegian harness racer.

He won 3,986 registered races during his career, which started in the 1960s. He hailed from Sandefjord and resided in Tjodalyng. He died from cancer in September 2014).

References

1946 births
2014 deaths
People from Sandefjord
People from Larvik
Norwegian harness racers
Deaths from cancer in Norway
Sportspeople from Vestfold og Telemark